William Sage may refer to:

 Bill Sage (born 1962), American actor
 William H. Sage (1859–1922), U.S. Army general and Medal of Honor recipient
 William M. Sage, American lawyer

See also
 Bill Le Sage (1927–2001), British musician